Abitibi was a former provincial electoral district in Quebec, Canada which elected members to the Legislative Assembly of Quebec. It was located in the general area of the modern-day Abitibi-Témiscamingue region in Western Quebec.

It was created for the 1923 election from parts of the Témiscamingue electoral district. Its last election was in 1939.  It disappeared in the 1944 election and was split into Abitibi-Ouest and Abitibi-Est.

Members of Legislative Assembly
Joseph-Édouard Perrault, Liberal (1923)
Hector Authier, Liberal (1923–1936)
Émile Lesage, Union Nationale (1936–1939)
Félix Allard, Liberal (1939–1944)

External links
Election results
 Election results (National Assembly)
 Election results (QuebecPolitique.com)

Former provincial electoral districts of Quebec